The Namhae, or Choson Namhae in North Korea, is the region of ocean near Korea that is bounded by the southwestern part of the Sea of Japan and by the southeastern part of the Yellow Sea. The name is not known and used outside Korea.

See also 
 Korea Strait

Seas of South Korea